Marcello Malagoli (born 14 July 1973) is an Italian baseball player who competed in the 2004 Summer Olympics.

References

1973 births
Living people
Olympic baseball players of Italy
Baseball players at the 2004 Summer Olympics
Modena Baseball Club players
De Angelis Godo players
Place of birth missing (living people)